Parker is a census-designated place and unincorporated community in central Yakima County, Washington, United States. It is located on U.S. Route 97 between the cities of Union Gap and Wapato on the Yakama Indian Reservation. The town had a population of 154 at the 2010 census.

History
The first plat for the town of Parker was filed January 6, 1909. It was originally settled by William Parker in 1864, and was named for him by the Northern Pacific Railway in 1890.

Parker does not have any form of city government. Police service is delivered by the Yakima County Sheriffs department, and a local volunteer fire station. The U.S. Postal Service provides post office box delivery on weekdays and Saturday. The ZIP code for Parker, Washington is 98939.  Currently, children attend Wapato public schools in the Wapato School District approximately four miles southeast of town.

Businesses include a wood cutting businesses, Nickoloffs Fruit Stand, and a fireworks stand that is open during the Fourth of July and New Years holiday seasons.

Local residents are primarily employed in occupations related to agriculture and fruit orchards.

Climate
This region experiences warm (but not hot) and dry summers, with no average monthly temperatures above 71.6 °F.  According to the Köppen Climate Classification system, Parker has a warm-summer Mediterranean climate, abbreviated "Csb" on climate maps.  Parker, Washington temperatures get well into the 80s and 90s for most of July and August, with some days into the low 100s.

References

Unincorporated communities in Yakima County, Washington
Unincorporated communities in Washington (state)
Census-designated places in Washington (state)
Census-designated places in Yakima County, Washington